Post-amendment to the Tamil Nadu Entertainments Tax Act 1939 on 1 April 1958, Gross jumped to 140 per cent of Nett  Commercial Taxes Department disclosed 18.17 crore in entertainment tax revenue for the year.

The following is a list of films produced in the Tamil film industry in India in 1978, in alphabetical order.

1978

References

Films, Tamil
Lists of 1978 films by country or language
1978
1970s Tamil-language films